Ohio Versus Everything (OVE, stylized as oVe) was an American professional wrestling stable that consisted primarily of Sami Callihan, Dave Crist, Jake Crist, and Madman Fulton.

The group's name is based on all four members hailing from the state of Ohio - the Crist Brothers are from New Carlisle (billed from nearby Dayton), Callihan is from Bellefontaine (West Central Ohio), and Fulton is from Toledo.

On the independent circuit, Callihan and the Crist Brothers worked together under the name Ohio Is For Killers (OI4K), which is a play on the song Ohio Is for Lovers.

Professional wrestling career

Combat Zone Wrestling (2011–2012; 2014–2018) 
On April 9, 2011, Jake Crist was invited to compete in Combat Zone Wrestling's "Best Of The Best X" representing Insanity Pro Wrestling. Jake Crist would go on to lose in the first round losing against Sami Callihan in a triple threat match that also involved A. R. Fox. The next night on April 10, 2011 at CZW's "International Incident" Jake Crist would go on to wrestle Jon Moxley in Moxley's final match in CZW in another losing effort. After the match Jake would be attacked by both Moxley and Robert Anthony until Devon Moore made the save. Jake Crist returned to CZW on May 14, 2011 in a losing effort against Ryan Mcbride however fans chanted Please Come Back after the match. On June 11, 2011 at CZW "Prelude To Violence" Jake Crist was told by CZW Owner D. J. Hyde that if Crist wanted a CZW Contract then he would have to go and defeat Sami Callihan.  Callihan would go on to defeat Jake Crist again. After the match both men showed respect by shaking hands. Adam Cole and Mia Yim would come down to mock Callihan. During the verbal confrontation D. J. Hyde would come out and lariat Callihan. Jake Crist would try to save Callihan but wound up attacked by D. J. Hyde. On July 9, 2011 at CZW "New Heights" A. R. Fox would offer a CZW Wired TV Championship title match to Jake Crist. Jake Crist would go on to gain his first win in CZW by defeating A. R. Fox to become the new CZW Wired TV Champion. Jake's Brother, Dave Crist would also make his CZW debut celebrating with his brother on title win. On September 10, 2011, Jake Crist was originally supposed to defend his newly won title against Chrisjen Hayme. However, Hayme would withdraw from the match and be replaced by Dustin Rayz. Jake Crist would go on to retain against Dustin Rayz. Dave Crist though, would show more concern about his brothers TV title than in Jake Crists well being. After the show Dustin Rayz would confront the Irish Airborne about Dave getting involved in his match against Jake. Rayz would then challenge Dave Crist at CZW "Cerebral". Dave would go one to win that match. Jake Crist successfully defended his Wired TV title against Latin Dragon earlier that night. On April 14, 2012, Dave defeated Jake with a low blow to win the CZW Wired TV Championship. Upon entering CZW, the Irish Airborne formed the Ohio is 4 Killers stable with Nevaeh and Sami Callihan.

On September 27, 2014, at Deja Vu, OI4K defeated the Juicy Product to win the CZW World Tag Team Championship. On July 11, 2015, at New Heights, OI4K lost the CZW World Tag Team Championship to Team Tremendous. In Infinity Pro Wrestling, the Crist Brothers defeated Donnie and Jacob Hollows.

Impact Wrestling (2017–2020) 
Dave and Jake Crist made their Impact Wrestling debut on August 17, 2017 at Destination X, under the name Ohio Versus Everything (oVe), defeating Jason Cade and Zachary Wentz. On August 20, at Victory Road, they defeated The Latin American Xchange (Ortiz and Santana) to win the GFW World Tag Team Championship. During their reign, the championship was renamed as the Impact World Tag Team Championship. On the October 12 episode of Impact, LAX invoked their rematch clause by challenging oVe to a 5150 Street Fight at Bound for Glory.

At Bound for Glory on November 5, Sami Callihan would debut as well as establish his alliance with The Crist Brothers by helping them defeat LAX, with Jake Crist low blowing Ortiz before Callihan delivered a piledriver through a table for the win. They proceeded to attack LAX after the match, resulting in a double turn, turning heel in the process. On the January 4, 2018 episode of Impact, they lost the title to The Latin American Xchange, ending their reign at 164 days. The Crist Brothers and Callihan then formed a faction, which Madman Fulton would later join in March 2019.

On the July 19 tapings of Impact, Jake Crist defeated Rich Swann to win the Impact X Division Championship. Crist would hold the title until October 20, when at Bound For Glory, Ace Austin won it in a five-way ladder match. On October 25, Callihan would defeat Brian Cage in a steel cage match during the Impact tapings to win the Impact World Championship. Callihan held the title until January 12, 2020, when he was defeated by Tessa Blanchard at Hard to Kill.

On the April 21, 2020 episode of Rebellion Callihan had a match against Ken Shamrock. During the match the other members of o.V.e interfered and attacked Shamrock. Callihan than attacked them thus leaving the group. On the May 19, 2020 episode of Impact, when Dave Crist was defeated by Crazzy Steve, Madman Fulton attacked Dave Crist and Jake Crist and announced he quit OVE. Dave was released from his contract on June 26, 2020, following sexual harassment and assault allegations surfaced as part of the Speaking Out Movement. Dave Crist has never denied the allegations against him and numerous other female wrestling personalities have come forward with more sexual and physical assault allegations. Since these allegations Dave Crist has been absent from the wrestling business.

Championships and accomplishments 
All American Wrestling
AAW Heavyweight Championship (3 times) – Callihan 
AAW Tag Team Championship (4 times) – Dave and Jake
Alpha-1 Wrestling
 A1 Tag Team Championship (1 time)
Absolute Intense Wrestling
AIW Tag Team Championship (1 time)
American Pro Wrestling Alliance
APWA World Tag Team Championship (1 time)
Combat Zone Wrestling
 CZW World Tag Team Championship (1 time)
CZW Wired TV Championship (2 times) – Jake (1), Dave (1)
Best of the Best 16 – Dave
Destination One Wrestling
D1W Tag Team Championship (1 time)
Harvest Cup (2014) – Dave
Heartland Wrestling Association
HWA Heavyweight Championship (2 times) – Jake
HWA Tag Team Championship (6 times)
HWA Television Championship (2 times) – Lotus (Dave) (1), Crazy J (Jake) (1)
HWA Heartland Cup (2011) – Jake
Impact Wrestling
Impact World Championship (1 time) – Callihan
Impact X Division Championship (1 time) – Jake
Impact World Tag Team Championship (1 time) – Dave and Jake
 Mashup Tournament (2019) – Callihan and Tessa Blanchard
 Moment of the Year (2018)  – Callihan destroys Eddie Edwards' face with a baseball bat
 Wrestler of the Year (2018) – Callihan
Infinity Pro Reign
Infinity Pro Duos Championship (1 time)
Insanity Pro Wrestling
IPW World Heavyweight Championship (1 time) – Jake
IPW Tag Team Championship (2 times)
IPW Junior Heavyweight Championship (5 times) – Dave (2), Jake (3)
IPW Super Junior Heavyweight Tournament – Dave (2004, 2006), Jake (2005)
IWA East Coast
IWA East Coast Tag Team Championship (1 time)
Independent Wrestling Association Mid-South
IWA Mid-South Heavyweight Championship (2 times) – Dave (1), Jake (1)
International Wrestling Cartel
IWC Tag Team Championship (1 time)
Juggalo Championship Wrestling
JCW Tag Team Championship (5 times)
Northwest Ohio Wrestling
NOW Heavyweight Championship (1 time) – Dave
Glass City Tournament (2016) – Dave
Pro Wrestling Illustrated
PWI ranked Jake #135 of the top 500 singles wrestlers in the PWI 500 in 2018
PWI ranked Dave #140 of the top 500 singles wrestlers in the PWI 500 in 2018
Rockstar Pro Wrestling
Cicero Cup (2014) – Jake
Rockstar Pro Championship (3 times) – Jake (2), Dave (1)
Rockstar Pro American Luchacore Championship (1 time) – Dave
Rockstar Pro Tag Team Championship (2 times) – Jake and Aaron Williams (1), Jake and Ron Mathis (1)
Rockstar Pro Trios Championship (1 time) – Dave and Sami Callihan with Jessicka Havok
Style Battle
Style Battle #1 – Dave
Xtreme Intense Championship Wrestling
XICW Tag Team Championship (1 time) – Dave, Aaron Williams, Dezmond Xavier, Kyle Maverick, Trey Miguel and Zachary Wentz

References

External links 

Impact Wrestling teams and stables
Independent promotions teams and stables
Japanese promotions teams and stables
Professional wrestlers from Ohio
Ring of Honor teams and stables